The Lone Star Conference men's basketball tournament is the annual conference basketball championship tournament for the Lone Star Conference. The tournament has been held annually since 1981. It is a single-elimination tournament and seeding is based on regular season records.

The winner, declared conference champion, receives the Lone Star Conference's automatic bid to the NCAA Men's Division II Basketball Championship.

Results

Championship records

 Arkansas–Fort Smith, Cameron, Dallas Baptist, Lubbock Christian, Oklahoma Christian, St. Mary's (TX), Texas A&M International, UT Tyler, and Western New Mexico have yet to qualify for the tournament finals.
 East Central (OK), Harding, Incarnate Word, Ouachita Baptist, and Sul Ross State never qualified for the tournament finals as Lone Star Conference members.
 Schools highlighted in pink are former members of the Lone Star Conference

See also
 Lone Star Conference women's basketball tournament

References

NCAA Division II men's basketball conference tournaments
Tournament
Recurring sporting events established in 1975